Digital architecture has been used to refer to other aspects of architecture that feature digital technologies. The emergent field is not clearly delineated to this point, and the terminology is also used to apply to digital skins that can be streamed images and have their appearance altered. A headquarters building design for Boston television and radio station WGBH by Polshek Partnership has been discussed as an example of digital architecture and includes a digital skin.

Overview
Architecture created digitally might not involve the use of actual materials (brick, stone, glass, steel, wood). It relies on "sets of numbers stored in electromagnetic format" used to create representations and simulations that correspond to material performance and to map out built artifacts. Digital architecture does not just represent "ideated space"; it also creates places for human interaction that do not resemble physical architectural spaces. Examples of these places in the "Internet Universe" and cyberspace include websites, multi-user dungeons, MOOs, and web chatrooms.

Digital architecture allows complex calculations that delimit architects and allow a diverse range of complex forms to be created with great ease using computer algorithms. The new genre of "scripted, iterative, and indexical architecture" produces a proliferation of formal outcomes, leaving the designer the role of selection and increasing the  possibilities in architectural design. This has "re-initiated a debate regarding curvilinearity, expressionism and role of technology in society" leading to new forms of non-standard architecture by architects such as Zaha Hadid, Kas Oosterhuis and UN Studio. A conference held in London in 2009 named "Digital Architecture London" introduced the latest development in digital design practice.

The Far Eastern International Digital Design Award (The Feidad Award) has been in existence since 2000 and honours "innovative design created with the aid of digital media." In 2005 a jury with members including a representative from Quantum Film, Greg Lynn from Greg Lynn FORM, Jacob van Rijs of MVRDV, Gerhard Schmitt, Birger Sevaldson (Ocean North), chose among submissions "exploring digital concepts such as computing, information, electronic media, hyper-, virtual-, and cyberspace in order to help define and discuss future space and architecture in the digital age."

See also
Architectural theory
Blobitecture
Digital age
Digital architect
Digital art
Digital mapping
Digital morphogenesis
Interactive architecture
Virtual reality
Cybertecture

References

Further reading

General
 Hovestadt, Ludger; Urs Hirschberg; Oliver Fritz (Eds.) (2020): Atlas of Digital Architecture: Terminology, Concepts, Methods, Tools, Examples, Phenomena. Basel/Berlin/Boston: Birkhäuser Verlag, .
 Oxman, Rivka and Oxman Robert 'Architectural Design - The New Structuralism: Design, Engineering and Architectural Technologies' Wiley, 2010. .
 Lynn, Greg. Animate Form. Princeton Architectural Press, 1998. .

Education
 Andia, Alfredo (2002). 'Reconstructing the Effects of Computers on Practice and Education during the Past Three Decades', Journal of Architectural Education, 56, 2, pp. 7–13

External links

Knowledge repositories
 Cumulative Index of Computer Aided Architectural Design (CUMINCAD)

Academic journals

Primary
 International Journal of Architectural Computing

Relevant
 Digital Creativity
 Nexus Network Journal

Associations and organizations
 Association for Computer-Aided Architectural Design Research in Asia (CAADRIA)
 Association for Computer-Aided Design in Architecture (ACADIA)
 CAADFutures Foundation
 Education and research in Computer Aided Architectural Design in Europe (eCAADe)
 The Iberoamerican Society of Digital Graphics (SIGraDi)

Architectural design